A number of organizations and academics consider the Nation of Islam (NOI) to be antisemitic. The NOI has engaged in Holocaust denial, proposes antisemitic, false interpretations of the Holocaust, and exaggerates the role of Jews in the African slave trade; mainstream historians, such as  Saul S. Friedman, have said Jews had a negligible role. The NOI has repeatedly rejected charges made against it as false and politically motivated.

Charges of antisemitism

The Anti-Defamation League, the Southern Poverty Law Center, the American Jewish Committee, the American Jewish Congress, and the Stephen Roth Institute for the Study of Contemporary Antisemitism and Racism have condemned the Nation of Islam as antisemitic.

Scholars of comparative religion have argued that the Nation of Islam is antisemitic and advocates Holocaust denial. For instance, in the Global Journal of Classical Theology, Professor Richard V. Pierard writes:

A report by the Stephen Roth Institute for studying Anti-Semitism and Racism states the following:

British Home Secretary Jack Straw and lawyers for the Home Office have also described Farrakhan's views as "anti-semitic and racially divisive", and as a result he has been banned from the United Kingdom since 1986.

A Catholic magazine, This Rock, has described the Nation of Islam as both antisemitic and anti-Catholic.

A number of prominent secular humanists have written that the NOI is antisemitic. Hating in the Name of God, by Benjamin Radford (Council for Secular Humanism website), and Madeline Weld's address to the 1995 annual meeting of the Humanist Association of Canada are examples of such criticism.

Farrakhan calls Jews "Satanic" and compares Jews to Termites 
Louis Farrakhan said in a 2014 speech that "the satanic Jews that control everything, and mostly everybody, if they are your enemy, you must, must be somebody." In an October 2018 speech, Farrakhan referred to Jews as termites: "So when they talk about Farrakhan, call me a hater, you know what they do, call me an anti-Semite. Stop it, I’m anti-Termite."

Jews "control the economy"
For many years certain Nation of Islam (NOI) ministers have been preaching that "the Jews" control the American economy and the world economy. Statements to this effect can be found in its newspaper The Final Call and in speeches given in their temples and on college campuses.

For example, the Dallas Observer recorded this dialogue between Nation-of-Islam leader Louis Farrakhan and an audience to which he was speaking:

Alleged major role of Jews in slave trade
The Secret Relationship Between Blacks and Jews is a book published in 1991 by the Nation of Islam. The book alleges that Jews dominated the Atlantic slave trade.  The book has been labeled an antisemitic canard by historians including Saul S. Friedman, who has written that Jews had a minimal role in New World slave trade. Henry Louis Gates, head of the department of Afro-American studies at Harvard University, called the book "the bible of new anti-Semitism" and added, "The book massively misinterprets the historical record, largely through a process of cunningly selective quotations of often reputable sources."

Criticisms of perceived Jewish "control"
Elijah Muhammad, Louis Farrakhan, Khalid Abdul Muhammad, and other NOI ministers have been frequently critical of what they perceive as the Jewish control over African American society, their beliefs frequently approaching conspiracy theory. For example:

Farrakhan gave a speech attacking then National Security Advisor Sandy Berger, Secretary of State Madeleine Albright, Treasury Secretary Robert Rubin, and presidential advisor (later Chicago mayor) Rahm Emanuel. In regards to their names, he stated that "Every Jewish person that is around the president is a dual citizen of Israel and the United States of America...and sometimes, we have to raise the question, Are you more loyal to the state of Israel than you are to the best interests of the United States of America?"

References to Jews as "bloodsuckers"
Some NOI ministers have called Jews bloodsuckers. For example, in his Saviours' Day speech in Chicago, Illinois, February 25, 1996, Louis Farrakhan stated:

One former NOI minister Khalid Abdul Muhammed referred to Jews as bloodsuckers.

Quotes from Khalid Abdul Muhammad, the spokesperson until 1993:

Malcolm X and antisemitism 

Nation of Islam identity Malcolm X has been widely accused of being antisemitic. His autobiography contains several antisemitic charges and caricatures of Jews. Alex Haley, the autobiography's co-author, had to rewrite some of the book in order to eliminate a number of negative statements about Jews in the manuscript. Malcolm X believed that the fabricated antisemitic text "Protocols of the Elders of Zion", was authentic and introduced it to NOI members, while blaming Jewish people for "perfecting the modern evil" of neo-colonialism. He was a leading figure in reshaping the black community's perception of The Holocaust, engaging in Holocaust trivialization and claiming that the Jews "brought it on themselves". 

In 1961, Malcolm X spoke at a NOI rally alongside George Lincoln Rockwell, the head of the American Nazi Party. Rockwell claimed that there was overlap between Black nationalism and White supremacy. Even after his departure from the NOI and during the last months of his life, Malcolm X's statements about Jews continued to include antisemitic images of Jews as "bloodsucker[s]".

Response to charges of antisemitism
The Nation of Islam has repeatedly denied charges of antisemitism. Louis Farrakhan has stated, "The ADL .. uses the term 'anti-Semitism' to stifle all criticism of Zionism and the Zionist policies of the State of Israel and also to stifle all legitimate criticism of the errant behavior of some Jewish people toward the non-Jewish population."

In a letter responding to Anti-Defamation League (ADL) Director Abraham Foxman's insistence that black leaders distance themselves from the Nation of Islam, hip hop mogul Russell Simmons wrote: "Simply put, you are misguided, arrogant, and very disrespectful of African Americans and most importantly your statements will unintentionally or intentionally lead to a negative impression of Jews in the minds of millions of African Americans," he continued, "For over 50 years, Minister Farrakhan has labored to resurrect the downtrodden masses of African Americans up out of poverty and self-destruction" and indicated that he had personally witnessed Farrakhan affirm, 'A Muslim can not hate a Jew. We are all members of the family of Abraham and all of us should maintain dialogue and mutual respect.'"

Jews, Nazis, and the Holocaust
Farrakhan stated at the Mosque Maryam in Chicago on March 19, 1995 that the Jews financed the Holocaust:

Khalid Abdul Muhammad, a former advisor to Farrakhan, stated that the Jews deserved to be exterminated by the Nazis. Echoing white supremacy propaganda, he holds that Jewish people undermined German society, and thus deserved to be targeted by the Nazis.

Cooperation with antisemitic groups

Holocaust deniers

The Nation of Islam's official position does not deny the Jewish holocaust. Tim Russert, during a 1997 Meet the Press interview with Louis Farrakhan, posed the question, "Do you believe there was a Holocaust in which 6 million Jews perished?"

Relationship with white supremacists

Elijah Muhammad's pro-separation views were compatible with those of some white supremacist organizations in the 1960s. He reportedly met with leaders of the Ku Klux Klan in 1961 to work toward the purchase of farmland in the deep south. He eventually established Temple Farms, now Muhammad Farms, on a  tract in Terrell County, Georgia. George Lincoln Rockwell, founder of the American Nazi Party once called Muhammad "the Hitler of the black man." At the 1962 Saviours' Day celebration in Chicago, Rockwell addressed Nation of Islam members.  Many in the audience booed and heckled him and his men, for which Muhammad rebuked them in the April 1962 issue of Muhammad Speaks.

See also

African American–Jewish relations
Conspiracy theory
Islam and antisemitism
Islam and Judaism

Notes

Works cited

Further reading
The Secret Relationship between Blacks and Jews by Historical Research Department of the Nation of Islam, 1991. .
"A historian critiques the book The Secret Relationship between Blacks and Jews" by David Walter Leinweber, H Net: Humanities and Social Sciences Online, retrieved April 3, 2005

External links

B'nai Brith Audit of Antisemitic Incidents
MSN Encarta: Louis Farrakhan (Archived 2009-11-01)
Anti-Semitism Worldwide 1997/8: Minister Louis Farrakhan and the Nation of Islam
Equal Opportunity and Social: Justice African American-Jewish Relations
Rev. Farrakhan and the Nation of Islam from The Public Eye
The New anti-Semitism

Anti-Defamation League documents and webpages
Nation of Islam
ADL Focus on Nation of Islam 
Anti-Defamation League report Nation of Islam

Final Call/Nation of Islam webpages
Farrakhan and the Jewish Rift; How it all started
Zionism, not Farrakhan is the problem, rabbis say
Minister Farrakhan and Jewish Delegation meet in Chicago
Interview with UIC Professor Michael Lieb
Nation of Islam leader pays historic visit to synagogue
Review of "The Secret Relationship Between Blacks and Jews, Volume One" by Donald Muhammad, The Final Call, November 18, 1991
FinalCall.com Interview with Ashahed M. Muhammad, author of "The Synagogue of Satan"

Jude Wanniski's Polyconomics webpages
An Interview with Nation of Islam leader Louis Farrakhan, Pt. 1 - On relations with Jewish community
An Interview with Nation of Islam leader Louis  Farrakhan, Pt. 2 - On relations with Jewish community
An Interview with Nation of Islam leader Louis  Farrakhan, Pt. 3 - On relations with Jewish community
Memo: To Howard P. Berkowitz, National Chair, Anti-Defamation League
Judaism is a gutter religion
Another View of Blacks and Jews

African American–Jewish relations
Islam and antisemitism
Nation of Islam